Coiled-Coil Domain Containing 198 (CCDC198) is a gene that encodes for a protein of the same name.

Bioinformation

Gene 
The gene spans 24,570 bp on human chromosome 14.

Transcript 
Isoform X2 of CCDC198 is 999 nucleotides long. CCDC198 is notably expressed in both the liver and the kidney.

Protein 
CCDC198 has 296 amino acids and a molecular mass of 34.7 kilodaltons.

Phylogeny
The gene is confined within Animals, as confident orthologs in fungi and chaonoflagettes were not found. The human gene shares defined homology with placental mammals, marsupials, monotremes, reptiles, birds, amphibians, cartilaginous fish and some homology in insects, lobe finned fish, chelicerates and corals (Figure 22). The following significant taxonomic groups do not yield confident homology: nematodes, cnidaria, platyhelminths, porifera, annelids, ctenophora, mollusca, echinodermata, myriapoda, agnatha, tunicata. Crustacea is a borderline case that may yield homology. It is notable that there is a sharp cut off in sequence similarity outside of mammals, and a sharp drop in ortholog frequency outside of amniotes.

Expression
CCDC198 is primarily expressed in the kidneys, liver and pancreas, and also shows minor but significant expression in the fallopian tubes based on general NCBI profile data. Based on NCBI GEO microarray data on diverse cell tissue, it is expressed in the bladder, lung, midgut, gallbladder and fallopian tube as well, with minor expression in the testis and prostate.

Relation with ubiquitin-related modifier 1 
An antibody has been developed to CCDC198 protein by Sigma-Aldrich. Known as Anti-C14orf105 or Anti-FLJ10650, it is synonymous with Anti-C9orf74, an antibody for the characterized Ubiquitin-related modifier 1 gene

Clinical significance 

The X12 isoform of CCDC198 has proposed as a potential marker of infection by the liver fluke Opisthorchis viverrini Though normally expressed even in healthy individuals, CCDC198 has a threefold abundance in infected individuals.
CCDC198 has more significant expression in those afflicted by alcoholic hepatitis.

References